Selaginella elmeri is a species of plant in the Selaginellaceae family.

Sources
 GBIF entry

elmeri